The Somayajna or Somayaga or Soma sacrifice is a Hindu ritual. It is a type of yajna associated with the lunar cycle, and regarded to be performed for the maintenance of the cosmic order.

This ritual is based on methods described in the Vedas. Soma is used as the main offering in this yajna, regarded to be able to propitiate deities. It is prescribed to be performed only by the Brahmanas.

Types 
The seven types of Somayajna are:

 Agniṣṭoma – The first and main type, the six others are considered variations of this
 Uktya
 Ṣoḍaśī
Atyagniṣṭoma
 Atirātra
 Āptoryāma 
Vājapeya

See also 
 Vedas
 Yajna

References

External links 
 || Acharya Dr. Vrajotsavji || - Creative projects for revival of Ancient Vedic practices

Soma (drink)
Yajna
Hindu rituals
Vedic customs